Raza Longknife is a fictional character appearing in American comic books published by Marvel Comics. The character is usually seen in the X-Men series and various spin-offs.  He is the last known surviving member of his unnamed alien race (which chose to die en masse in one final battle against the Shi'ar empire as the culmination of their warrior culture), and a member of the Starjammers.

Publication history
Dave Cockrum created the Starjammers with the intent of having them star in their own series. However, when he submitted the concept for Marvel's two try-out series, Marvel Spotlight and Marvel Premiere, he was repeatedly informed that these series were booked for two years solid. Running out of patience, Cockrum showed the Starjammers to X-Men writer Chris Claremont, and convinced him to use the characters for this series.

Fictional character biography
While imprisoned on Alisbar, Raza Longknife (his last name is an English translation of his true last name) met and formed the band of smugglers and space pirates known as the Starjammers; with Corsair, Hepzibah, and Ch'od, and associated himself with the group. He is a cyborg, being partly living flesh and partly machine. Because Raza speaks an archaic dialect of his native language, his words are translated into an equally archaic form of English, which can be both an annoyance and a source of amusement to his allies. Raza was married, though his wife is now deceased, and he has a son named Rion. "His initial grudge against the Shi'ar came about when their former emperor, D'Ken, slaughtered Raza's race of people, but Vulcan became the focus of Raza's rage after he murdered Raza's friend Corsair."

With the Starjammers, he came to the aid of the X-Men against D'Ken's Imperial Guard. Much later, with the other Starjammers, he fought off an alien attack on the Starjammer vessel. He engaged in mock combat with Carol Danvers, after she joined with the Starjammers. With the Starjammers, he aided the New Mutants in combat against the Magus. Together with Danvers, then known as Binary, he sought the "map-rod" holding information on the location of the "Phalkon" power source; this power source turned out to be the Phoenix. Raza and the Starjammers were attacked by Deathbird's Shi'ar starships. With the Starjammers, he first met and fought Excalibur on Earth and aided a rebellion against Deathbird on a Shi'ar border world. Raza was later captured by the Warskrulls, and impersonated by one of them, but was ultimately freed by the X-Men.

Alongside Hepzibah and Ch'od, Raza battled Wonder Man during the Kree/Shi'ar War, while escorting the Shi'ar nega-bomb to the Kree Empire. With Hepzibah, Raza accepted an assignment from a former Kree admiral to kill the Black Knight in hopes of being reunited with his son. With the Starjammers, Raza visited the Avengers and Binary on Earth, and Raza fought and seriously injured the Black Knight. Raza battled Hercules, but was defeated by the Vision. Raza confided in Binary, who reconciled him with the Avengers. He fell out with Hepzibah, but returned with the Starjammers to the Shi'ar Empire.

Raza has suffered from the death of his loyal friend Corsair. He has also dealt with Hepzibah's stranding on Earth although several X-Men have remained with the Starjammers.

In the "X-Men: Kingbreaker" miniseries, Raza was infected and became reluctant host to the alien symbiote known as ZZZXX. The symbiote-controlled Raza subsequently becomes a member of Emperor Vulcan's Imperial Guard. In the concluding events of the War of Kings, Raza was incapacitated by the Nova Corps and is presumed to be receiving expert medical attention to remove the symbiote.

Powers and abilities
Raza has been converted into a cyborg, with various bionic body parts, including his left eye, his left arm and hand, and much of his face and thorax. This gives him superhuman strength, enhanced agility, speed, and reflexes thanks to his robotic parts. Raza's cyborg body contains computers that he can utilize for various tasks. Raza can convert his bionic left hand into a bladed weapon at will. His cyborg body contains advanced sensor systems and atmosphere processing systems that enable him to breathe in various alien environments. He is a skilled hand-to-hand combatant, trained in various forms of combat known in the Shi'ar Galaxy. He is a brilliant swordsman and marksman, with various forms of Shi'ar weaponry. He wears battle armor of unspecified composition, and uses Shi'ar knives, swords, and energy guns.

Other versions

Age of Apocalypse
Raza appears as a member of the Starjammers, this time captained by Deathbird. He seems to have the same history as his mainstream counterpart.

Other media

Television
 Raza Longknife appears in the 5-Part Phoenix Saga of X-Men. He appears as a member of the Starjammers.

References

External links
 

Characters created by Dave Cockrum
Comics characters introduced in 1977
Fictional knife-fighters
Fictional swordfighters in comics
Marvel Comics aliens
Marvel Comics characters who can move at superhuman speeds
Marvel Comics characters with superhuman strength
Marvel Comics cyborgs
Marvel Comics extraterrestrial superheroes
Marvel Comics martial artists
Marvel Comics superheroes
Space pirates